Mahr Rafat Al Quwari or Mahrar Rafat Al Quwari is a Palestinian who was detained at Guantanamo Bay detention camp due to being accused of alliance to al-Qaeda. According to the United States Department of Defense, he was in charge of bookkeeping for supply and logistics operations of the al-Qaeda fighters in the Tora Bora mountains. According to another source, he and other Arabs were kidnapped and detained by Afghan armed men for one month then he was turned over to US troops and rendered to Bagram and eventually to Guantanamo. He was cleared for release in 2007 but never got out, instead, he was transferred to Hungary in 2009.

References

1965 births
Living people
Detainees of the Guantanamo Bay detention camp